"Stupid Shit" is the second single from the American girl group Girlicious's debut album Girlicious. It was digitally released to iTunes on April 22, 2008 in the US and in Canada. After the departure of Tiffanie Anderson, Nichole Cordova started performing her parts.

Release
"Stupid Shit" was released on April 22, 2008, from the EP Like Me / Stupid Shit in the US and Canada.

Chart performance
Without being sent to radio, the single debuted at number 20 on the Canadian Hot 100 solely from digital downloads before finally dropping off after 10 weeks.

Music video
The music video for "Stupid Shit" was directed by Robin Antin and Mikey Minden and premiered alongside "Like Me" following the season finale of Pussycat Dolls Present: Girlicious. The video features Girlicious in school girl uniforms running around dancing and stripping, doing "Stupid Shit". During the "stripping" scene of the video, the Paradiso Girls and Vegas Dolls can be seen amongst the background girls.
The video debuted on the MuchMusic Countdown at #29 and peaked at #1 where it stayed for one week.

Charts

Release history

Awards and nominations

|-
|2009
| "Stupid S***"
| Most Watched Video On Muchmusic.com
|
|-

References

2008 singles
2008 songs
American dance-pop songs
Geffen Records singles
Girlicious songs
Songs written by Beau Dozier
Songs written by Stefanie Ridel